Hangu District, is a former district in eastern Tianjin, China; now part of Binhai New Area. It serves as a gateway towards Liaoning, Jilin and Heilongjiang provinces.

Geography
Bohai Bay is located to the south and connects with Ninghe County in the north. The river vents 720 million m3 of water to the sea annually. The district has two reservoirs, the capacity of Yingcheng reservoir is 30 million m3, while that of Gaozhuang reservoir is 4.5 million m3.

Climate 

Hangu District has a humid continental climate (Köppen climate classification Dwa).

Economy
Hangu has a dualistic economic structure of a large city and small country. The northwest of the district is the agricultural area, while its southeast is the industrial area as well as ocean fishery area. The city zone is centrally located, on both sides of Jiyun River.

Industry
Hangu District has a stable foundation in its industries. Much of the districts industry is based in the Binhai area. Marine chemical production forms the largest part of the areas industry, followed by other synthetic production industries. Its industrial output amounts to 80% of the national income. There are 13 kinds of primary industries like salt, chemical, textile, clothing, mechanism, metallurgy processing, paper making, home appliances, furniture, electronics, architectural materials, foods and shoemaking. The Changlu Hangu saltfield is one of the four saltfields of the famous Changlu salt area, which has a strong capacity in crude salt production. It also produces a series of high-quality products in the fields of fine salt and chemical, most of which are exported. Agriculture and fisheries make up the rest of Hangu's economy. Rice, fruits, aquatic products are the prominent features of the agricultural products in Hangu. The area's grapes contain high amounts of sugar and are used for wine production.

Marine Industry
The district boasts plentiful marine chemical resources. The area's coast line spans 32 kilometers, contains 27 species of seawater and freshwater fish and its history of salt processing dates back over 1000 years. Its 'Changlu salt' is world-renowned and is white in color and large in size. It has owned the reputation of "Jade in Lutai" from the old. As the average content of sodium chloride is 96.8%, it is a perfect raw material for use in marine chemicals.

Power supply
Much of the areas electric power is generated from Solar energy, while there is also widespread use of oil resources and geothermal power, which  has been heavily exploited. Other methods of power supply are being considered for future development, such as wave power and wind power.

Land usage
One is in the southeast part containing the Jiyun river and is near the coast to the east and has the Tanggu highway and Beijing - Shanhaiguan railway. Meanwhile, this land has Yingcheng reservoir and processing establishments for industrial sewage in the south and public city infrastructures in the north. The northeastern part of Hangu is also undeveloped with Hannan railway running through it.

Transport
The area is linked to the Jingshan and Beijing-Shanhaiguan railways. The Hannan line also leads to the Nanbao saltfield in Hebei Province and the regional industrial shuttle line have been established in Hangu. Four railway stations serve the district with an annual output exceeding 5 million tons. Hangu is well connected to China's road network with 7 routes leading towards the area, including the Lu-Han, Tang-Han, Jin-Han, Han-Yu, Hannan, Hanbei and Lutang roads which connect Hangu with TEDA, Tianjin New Port, Beijing, Tangshan and northeast China.

References

External links
Hangu District government website

Districts of Tianjin
1961 establishments in China
2009 disestablishments in China